Claremont Township may refer to the following townships in the United States:

 Claremont Township, Richland County, Illinois
 Claremont Township, Dodge County, Minnesota

Township name disambiguation pages